Marianna Pia Villani Scicolone known as Maria (born 11 May 1938) is an Italian television personality, columnist and singer.

Early life 
Scicolone was born in Rome.

Family 
Her sister is the actress Sofia Loren. She is also the widow of Romano Mussolini and mother of Alessandra Mussolini.

References

See also 

 Mussolini family

Living people
1938 births

People from Rome
Italian television presenters
Italian women television presenters
20th-century Italian women
21st-century Italian women
Mussolini family
20th-century Italian women singers